Melinda Szik (born December 5, 1974, in Budapest) is a retired female weightlifter from Hungary. She competed for her native country at the 2000 Summer Olympics in Sydney, Australia, where she finished in ninth place in the women's superheavyweight division (+ 75 kg).

References
 sports-reference

1974 births
Living people
Hungarian female weightlifters
Weightlifters at the 2000 Summer Olympics
Olympic weightlifters of Hungary
Sportspeople from Budapest